Topashaw Creek is a stream in the U.S. state of Mississippi. It is a tributary to the Yalobusha River.

Topashaw is a name derived from the Choctaw language purported to mean either (sources vary) "little chestnut tree" or named after the Taposa people. Variant names are "Tapashaw Creek", "Topasaw Creek", "Topisaw Creek", "Toposhaw Creek", and "Tupashaw Creek".

References

Rivers of Mississippi
Rivers of Calhoun County, Mississippi
Rivers of Chickasaw County, Mississippi
Riversr of Webster County, Mississippi
Mississippi placenames of Native American origin